The Black Country Local Enterprise Partnership is a local enterprise partnership which seeks to help with economic growth and future plans around the Black Country in the West Midlands County, England. The partnership is shared around the Dudley Metropolitan Borough, Sandwell Metropolitan Borough, Walsall Metropolitan Borough and the city of Wolverhampton. These are also part of the West Midlands Conurbation, along with Birmingham and Solihull, as well as Coventry, although this is not part of the conurbation but rather the county. The partnership is also the only partnership to adopt the historic Black Country name as the country is only recognized by the Black Country Flag and its history in industrial.

Members 

The LEP covers the towns of Aldridge, Bilston, Brownhills, Darlaston, Dudley, Halesowen, Oldbury, Smethwick, Stourbridge, Tipton, Walsall, Wednesbury, West Bromwich, Willenhall, and the city of Wolverhampton.

Sources
The Black Country Local Enterprise Partnership – About Us

Local enterprise partnerships
Black Country